The Piedra La Tortuga Natural Monument Also Piedra La Tortuga Is a protected natural space located in the Atures municipality, in the Amazonas state, in the south of Venezuela. Received the status of natural monument by decree No. 2.351 of June 5, 1992. Official Gazette No. 35089 of November 11, 1992.

It is located 15 km, approximately from Puerto Ayacucho, heading South. Municipality Atures. Covering 525 hectares, it is home to two indigenous communities of the Hiwi (Guahiba) and Piaroa or Wothuha ethnic groups.

It consists of two granite outcrops of magmatic origin, belonging to the Serrania del Parhuaza, constituted by acid rocks of the Precambrian of magmatic origin, with an approximate age of 1,500 million years. Here is the largest petroglyph known in the country, as well as caves and cemeteries of ancient indigenous populations, with a great variety of cave paintings.

Gallery

See also
List of national parks of Venezuela
Piedra del Cocuy Natural Monument

References

Natural monuments of Venezuela
Protected areas established in 1992